G29 may refer to:

 BMW Z4 (G29), a two-door roadster
 Glock 29, a pistol
 Haenel RS9, a German sniper rifle
 Logitech G29, a racing wheel
 , an O-class destroyer of the Royal Navy